"Empty Places" is the 19th episode of the seventh and final season of the television series Buffy the Vampire Slayer.

Plot
The citizens of Sunnydale flee en masse to escape the Hellmouth and Sunnydale becomes a ghost town. Buffy spots Clem in his car on his way out; he urges her to leaves town for this particular apocalypse.

Giles and Willow go to get information from the police on Caleb, with Willow using some mind control to convince the officer that they are with Interpol. Spike and Andrew leave to pursue a lead. They discover an engraving on a plaque that states that the power they are searching for is to be wielded by "her" alone. At the deserted school, Buffy is confronted by Caleb, who grabs her by the neck and throws her through a window into a wall, rendering her unconscious. After she awakens, Buffy returns home to discover that Faith has taken Dawn and the Potentials to The Bronze for a night of relaxation.

After they run into trouble with the police, who threaten to kill or injure Faith, and briefly hold Dawn and the Potentials hostage at the Bronze, Buffy confronts the group, minus the absent Spike and Andrew, and demands that they make better choices, and reveals her plans for another attack. But at this point, the Potentials, as well as Dawn, Willow, Xander, Anya, Giles and Principal Wood, tell Buffy that they no longer trust her leadership. At Dawn's request, Buffy leaves the house and Faith reluctantly becomes the new leader.

References

External links

 

Buffy the Vampire Slayer (season 7) episodes
2003 American television episodes